Prochoristis campylopa is a moth in the family Crambidae. It is found in the Democratic Republic of Congo.

References

Cybalomiinae
Moths described in 1935